Laura Groeseneken (born 30 April 1990), also known as Sennek, is a Belgian singer and songwriter. She represented Belgium in the Eurovision Song Contest 2018 with the song A Matter of Time, but did not make it to the final.

Groeseneken has performed as the keyboardist for Belgian musician Ozark Henry, performing with him at Rock Werchter. She worked as a visual merchandiser for IKEA, while also working as a vocal coach in her hometown. Groeseneken has written music for the Belgian pop-rock band, Hooverphonic with Alex Callier.

Singles

References

External links

1990 births
Belgian electronic musicians
Eurovision Song Contest entrants for Belgium
Belgian women pop singers
Belgian songwriters
Belgian soul singers
Eurovision Song Contest entrants of 2018
Living people
Musicians from Leuven
21st-century Belgian singers
21st-century Belgian women singers
IKEA people